Chelanyssus is a genus of mites in the family Laelapidae.

Species
 Chelanyssus forsythi (Zumpt, 1950)

References

Laelapidae